Fever is a 2014 drama film directed by Elfi Mikesch and produced by Amour Fou. The film was shot in Luxembourg, Austria, Italy and Serbia and had its world premiere in the Panorama section of the 64th Berlin International Film Festival. The film is set in Austria in the early 1950s.

Cast
 Eva Mattes
 Martin Wuttke
 Carolina Cardoso
 Nicole Max
 Sascha Ley
 Nilton Martins as Berber Tilelli

References

External links
 

2014 films
2014 drama films
Austrian drama films
2010s German-language films